Subrata Maitra (Kanchan) is an Indian politician from Bharatiya Janata Party. In May 2021, he was elected as a member of the West Bengal Legislative Assembly from Berhampore (constituency). He defeated  Naru Gopal Mukherjee  of AITC by 26,852 votes in 2021 West Bengal Assembly election. This was the first time after India's Independence that a BJP leader is holding MLA Position from Berhampore seat in Vidhan Sabha Election.

References 

Living people
Year of birth missing (living people)
21st-century Indian politicians
Bharatiya Janata Party politicians from West Bengal
West Bengal MLAs 2021–2026